Gerhard Winkler may refer to:

 Gerhard Winkler (biathlete) (born 1951), German former biathlete
 Gerhard Winkler (composer) (1906–1977), German songwriter
 Gerhard "Geri" Winkler (born 1956), Austrian mountaineer
 Gerhard E. Winkler (born 1959), Austrian composer